Fartan-e Kohneh (also Romanized as Farţān-e Kohneh) is a village in Azari Rural District, in the Central District of Esfarayen County, North Khorasan Province, Iran. At the 2006 census, its population was 1,749, in 403 families.

References 

Populated places in Esfarayen County